Pauline Boudry / Renate Lorenz (born 1972 in Lausanne and 1963 in Berlin) are a Berlin-based artist duo who have worked together since 2006. They produce film installations that revisit recent and past material (a score, a piece of music, a film, a photograph or a performance), with a particular focus on a critical history of the photographic and moving image itself.

The duo works with performance to create embodiments which are able to conflate different times and they often create illegitimate collaborations – partly fictitious, partly cross-temporal. Their work To Valerie Solanas and Marilyn Monroe, In Recognition of their Desperation (2013) is based on the eponymous 1970 score by avant-garde feminist composer Pauline Oliveros, filmed in Funkhaus Nalepastraße, the former GDR Radio studios in Berlin, and featuring performances from the musicians Rachel Aggs, Peaches, Catriona Shaw, Verity Susman, Ginger Brooks Takahashi, and William Wheeler. The work had its premiere exhibition as part of their solo show Patriarchal Poetry at Badischer Kunstverein, Karlsruhe, in Autumn 2013 and was shown at Museum of Modern Art, New York, in a special event with the artists, Oliveros and Gregg Bordowitz in May 2014. In I Want they stage a meeting between punk poet Kathy Acker, artist Sharon Hayes, and transgender- and prison-abolitionist activist Chelsea Manning, who, in 2010, channeled classified information about the war in Iraq to WikiLeaks. The performers in their films are choreographers, dancers, artists and musicians, with whom they are having a long-term conversation about performance, the meaning of visibility since early modernity, the pathologization of bodies, but also about companionship, glamour and resistance.
Recent retrospectives and solo exhibitions have included Improvisation télépathique, at Centre Culturel Suisse, Paris, 2018; Everybody talks about the weather... we don´t at Participant Inc., New York, 2017; Loving, Repeating, Kunsthalle Wien, Vienna, 2015; Portrait of an Eye, Kunstalle Zürich, Zürich, 2015; Aftershow, CAPC, Bordeaux, 2013; Toxic Play in Two Acts, South London Gallery, 2012; Contagieux! Rapports contre la normalité, Centre d'Art Contemporain Genève, 2011.

In 2019 Pauline Boudry / Renate Lorenz were invited to represent Switzerland at the 58th Venice Biennale.

Their work has been written about by writers and critics including André Lepecki, Gregg Bordowitz, Antke Engel and Mathias Danbolt. Their catalogues include Telepathic Improvisation, published by Contemporary Arts Museum Houston, 2018, I Want, published by Sternberg Press, 2015; Aftershow, published by Sternberg Press, 2014, and Temporal Drag, published by Hatje Cantz in 2011.

Pauline Boudry / Renate Lorenz  are represented by Ellen de Bruijne Projects, Amsterdam, and Marcelle Alix, Paris.

References 

Living people
Art duos
German contemporary artists
Swiss contemporary artists
Queer artists
1972 births
Swiss expatriates in Germany
German expatriates in Switzerland